Pločnik is an archaeological site in the village of the same name in Toplica District, Serbia. A 120 hectare settlement belonging to the Neolithic Vinča culture existed on the site from 5500 BCE until it was destroyed by fire in 4700 BCE.

The site was first discovered during railway construction in 1927, but was investigated only sporadically until excavations carried out by the Prokuplje Museum the National Museum of Serbia began in 1996.

The Vinča houses at Pločnik had stoves and special holes specifically for rubbish, and the dead were buried in cemeteries. People slept on woollen mats and fur and made clothes of wool, flax and leather. The figurines found not only represent deities but many show the daily life of the inhabitants while crude pottery finds appear to have been made by children. Women are depicted in short tops and skirt wearing jewellery. A thermal well found near the settlement might be evidence of Europe's oldest spa.

The preliminary dating of a Pločnik metal workshop with a furnace and copper tools to 5,500 BCE, if correct, indicates the Copper Age could have started in Europe 500 years or more earlier than previously thought. The sophisticated furnace and smelter featured earthen pipe-like air vents with hundreds of tiny holes in them and a chimney to ensure air goes into the furnace to feed the fire and smoke comes out away from the workers. Copper workshops from later periods thought to indicate the beginning of the Copper Age were less advanced, lacked chimneys and workers blew air on the fire with bellows. In 2008, a copper axe was found at Pločnik that when dated pushed back the start of the Copper Age by 500 years.

A study published in December 2013 dated some tin bronze artifacts to 4,500 BCE.

References

Vinča culture
Archaeological sites in Serbia